ReWined is a 2013 neo-noir film written and directed  by Ferdinando Vicentini Orgnani and starring Vincenzo Amato and Giovanna Mezzogiorno. It is based on the novel Vino dentro by Fabio Marcotto.

Plot

Cast 

  Vincenzo Amato  as Giovanni Cuttin
 Giovanna Mezzogiorno as  Adele
 Lambert Wilson as The Professor 
  Pietro Sermonti as  Commissario Sanfelice
  Daniela Virgilio as  Margherita
 Erika Blanc  as Madre Commissario Sanfelice
 Gioele Dix as  Direttore rivista Bibenda
Veronica Gentili as Miriam Poggiolini 
 Franco Trevisi as Marco

See also 
 List of Italian films of 2013

References

External links 

2013 films
2013 thriller films
Italian thriller films
Italian neo-noir films
2010s Italian films